The list of shipwrecks in 1786 includes some ships sunk, wrecked or otherwise lost during 1786.

January

1 January

3 January

4 January

5 January

6 January

7 January

8 January

10 January

14 January

15 January

17 January

Unknown date

February

2 February

3 February

5 February

7 February

21 February

23 February

25 February

Unknown date

March

4 March

5 March

15 March

16 March

17 March

31 March

Unknown date

April

2 April

10 April

17 April

20 April

24 April

Unknown date

May

6 May

7 May

Unknown date

June

Unknown date

July

13 July

16 July

Unknown date

August

5 August

29 August

30 August

31 August

Unknown date

September

2 September

3 September

8 September

14 September

15 September

16 September

22 September

23 September

24 September

27 September

Unknown date

October

4 October

20 October

24 October

28 October

Unknown Date

November

3 November

6 November

14 November

23 November

26 November

28 November

30 November

Unknown date

December

2 December

8 December

10 December

14 December

15 December

16 December

17 December

23 December

24 December

27 December

Unknown date

Unknown date

References

1786